The Essential Judy Garland is a compilation album by singer Judy Garland, released in 2006.

Track listing 
"Life Is Just a Bowl of Cherries"
"I Happen to Like New York"
"Comes Once in a Lifetime"
"If I Love Again"
"The Far Away Part of Town"
"Zing! Went The Strings of My Heart"
"You Go To My Head"
"The Man That Got Away" (Live)
"I Get the Blues When It Rains"
"Come Rain or Come Shine"
"Any Place I Hang My Hat is Home"
"It Never Was You" (Previously Unreleased)
"Lucky Day"
"Happiness is Just a Thing Called Joe"
"Hello Bluebird"
"By Myself"
"April Showers"
"Why Was I Born" (Alternative Take; Previously Unreleased)
"Rock-A-Bye Your Baby (With A Dixie Melody)"
"Over the Rainbow" (Live)

References

External links
 The Judy Garland Online Discography "Essential Judy Garland" page.

Judy Garland albums
2006 compilation albums